Sirjan railway station ( – Īstgāh-e Rāh-e Āhan; also known as Īstgāh-e Rāh-e Āhan-e Sīrjān) is a village in Najafabad Rural District, in the Central District of Sirjan County, Kerman Province, Iran. At the 2006 census, its population was 752, in 172 families.

References 

Populated places in Sirjan County